""Yume" ~Mugen no Kanata~" is the major debut single and fifth overall single release by ViViD, release under Sony Music Entertainment's sub label EPIC Records. The single was released in three different versions: two limited CD+DVD editions (A+B) and a regular CD only edition. Both limited editions come with the title song's PV; limited edition A contains three live performances taken from their August 8th, 2010 live show at Shibuya-AX, while limited edition B comes with a live performance of "Take-off". The regular edition comes with another B-side song, titled "risk". The title track was used as an ending theme song for the anime "Level E". The single reached #6 on the Oricon weekly charts, where it charted for eight weeks.

Track listing

References

2011 singles
Vivid (band) songs
2011 songs
Epic Records singles